Reston may refer to:

Places
Reston, Florida, an unincorporated community in Florida, United States
Reston, Lincolnshire, a parish in England
Reston, Manitoba, a small community in southwestern Manitoba, Canada
Reston Scar, a fell in Cumbria, England
Reston, Scottish Borders, a village in the southeast of Scotland
Reston railway station
Reston, Virginia, a census-designated place in Fairfax County, Virginia, United States

Other uses
Reston (surname)
 Reston foam, a 3M surgical dressing; see auricular splint
Reston Group, a Silurian to Devonian lithostratigraphic group
Reston Publishing, a defunct imprint of Prentice Hall
Reston virus, a form of Ebolavirus

See also
Reston Parkway (disambiguation)
Reston Station, a mixed-use development and railway station in Reston, Virginia